Raffi, full name Raffi Cavoukian (born 1948), is a Canadian singer-songwriter best known for his children's music.

Raffi may also refer to:

Raffi (novelist), pen name of Hakob Melik-Hakobian (1835–1888), Armenian author and poet
Raffi Boghosyan, or Raffi, (born 1993), Bulgarian singer
Rafi (name), or Raffi, a name of Arabic origin

See also
Rafi (disambiguation)
Raffy (disambiguation)

Armenian masculine given names